Line 7 of Nanjing Metro is a northeast–southwest line running roughly parallel to the south bank of the Yangtze River. The line began operation on 28 December 2022. This line is also the first metro line to use GoA4 automated trains in Nanjing.

History
Construction of Line 7 began on 29 November 2017.

The north section from Xianxinlu to Mufuxilu opened on 28 December 2022, while the central section from Mufuxilu to Yingtiandajie and the south section from Yingtiandajie to Xishanqiao are still under construction.

Opening timeline

Stations

References 

Nanjing Metro lines
2022 establishments in China
Railway lines opened in 2022